Helen Hunt (born 1963) is an American actress.

Helen Hunt may also refer to:

Helen Stewart Hunt (born 1938), Canadian swimmer
Helen Hunt Jackson (1830–1885), author and activist
Helen Hunt (hair stylist), Hollywood hair stylist
Helen LaKelly Hunt (born 1949), founder and president of The Sister Fund
"Helen Hunt" (Legends of Tomorrow), an episode of Legends of Tomorrow